Deux-Nèthes was a department of the First French Republic and of the First French Empire in present-day Belgium and the Netherlands. It was named after two branches of the river Nete (Grote Nete and Kleine Nete). The southern part of its territory corresponds more or less with the present-day Belgian province of Antwerp. It was created on 1 October 1795, when the Austrian Netherlands were officially annexed by the French Republic. Its territory was the northern part of the former duchy of Brabant. After the annexation of the Kingdom of Holland in 1810, the department was expanded with the western half of the present-day Dutch province of North Brabant, itself historically part of the Duchy of Brabant.

The Chef-lieu of the department was Antwerp (Anvers in French). The department was subdivided into the following four arrondissements and cantons (with French names):

 Anvers): Anvers (4 cantons), Brecht, Ekeren, Kontich, Wilrijk and Zandhoven.
 Bréda: Bergues-sur-le-Zon, Bréda, Ginneken, Oosterhout, Oudenbosch, Rosendael and Zevenbergen.
 Malines: Duffel, Heyst-sur-la-Montagne, Lierre, Malines (2 cantons) and Puers.
 Turnhout: Arendonk, Herentals, Hoogstraten, Mol, Turnhout and Westerlo.

After Napoleon was defeated in 1814, the department became part of the United Kingdom of the Netherlands as the provinces of Antwerp and North Brabant.

Administration

Prefects
The Prefect was the highest state representative in the department.

Secretaries General
The Secretary General was the deputy to the Prefect.

Subprefects of Anvers
The office of Subprefect of Anvers was held by the Prefect until 1811.

Subprefects of Bréda
This subprefecture was created in 1810 and suppressed a month later.

Subprefects of Malines

Subprefects of Turnhout

References

Former departments of France in Belgium
Former departments of France in the Netherlands
19th century in Antwerp
History of Antwerp
History of Antwerp Province
History of North Brabant
1795 establishments in France